Salvatore Vincent Maroni is a fictional character appearing in American comic books published by DC Comics, commonly in association with Batman. The substantial character is portrayed as a powerful mob boss and gangster of Italian descent in Gotham City and an enemy of Batman. Maroni is most famous for disfiguring Harvey Dent, setting the stage for the young district attorney's transformation into the supervillain Two-Face.

In live-action, Maroni has been portrayed in film by Dennis Paladino in Batman Forever (1995) and Eric Roberts in The Dark Knight (2008), while on television he has been portrayed by David Zayas in the series Gotham (2014).

Publication history
Sal Maroni first appeared in Detective Comics #66 and was created by Bill Finger and Bob Kane.

Fictional character biography

Pre-Crisis/Earth-Two
Maroni's first Pre-Crisis appearance was in Detective Comics #66 (August 1942) as Boss Moroni, a mobster on trial for the murder of a man named "Bookie" Benson. Harvey Dent (here named "Harvey Kent") is the prosecutor at the trial. He calls Batman as his first witness. During Batman's testimony, Moroni calls Batman a liar, leading Dent to show his proof: Moroni's lucky two-headed silver dollar found at the scene with his fingerprints on it. Enraged, Moroni throws a vial of acid at Dent, horribly disfiguring his face. Driven insane by his disfigurement, Dent becomes the gangster Two-Face and eventually kills Maroni before surrendering and going to prison.

Bronze Age/Earth-One
During Bronze Age recountings of Two-Face's origin, Maroni's role was unchanged, but his name was changed to Morelli. Harvey Kent's surname was altered to Dent, which has become that character's permanent name. In this version, Batman is present at the trial and tries to prevent the mobster from throwing the acid, but is unable to prevent Dent from being disfigured.

Prior to Crisis on Infinite Earths, Maroni appeared in DC Superstars #14 and Batman #328 to #329. He survives an assassination attempt by Two-Face in the first story, but his legs are left paralyzed. In the latter story arc, he undergoes plastic surgery to alter his appearance and changes his name to Anton Karoselle to avoid attention. He then exacts revenge on Two-Face by killing his former wife Gilda's new husband Dave Stevens allowing the gangster to find him and gun him down in retaliation.

Post-Crisis
In the graphic novel Batman and the Monster Men, Maroni lends money to Norman Madison (father of Bruce Wayne's girlfriend Julie Madison) to cover his debts, and to Professor Hugo Strange for his genetic experiments. After Maroni puts pressure on Strange to repay his loan, the mad scientist responds by robbing one of his illegal gambling establishments to steal the money he needs to pay Maroni off. When Maroni realizes Strange might be responsible for the robbery, he sends enforcers to intimidate and threaten him. Strange decides to get rid of Maroni once and for all, and sends another creature to kill him. Maroni is saved by Batman, who as a favor to Julie Madison, forces him to call off her father's debt.

In the sequel, Batman and the Mad Monk, Norman tries to pay off his debt to Maroni, unaware of Batman's intervention on his behalf; Maroni refuses to take the money, terrified that Batman would visit him again. Norman instead gives the money to rival mobster Carmine Falcone, which humiliates Maroni. Later, near the end of the story, Norman tries to kill Maroni only to be gunned down by his men.

Maroni is featured prominently in Jeph Loeb's maxi-series Batman: The Long Halloween, which retells Two-Face's origin. In this version, Salvatore Maroni is the scion of the Maroni crime family, headed by his father Luigi "Big Lou" Maroni. He is the most powerful mobster in Gotham next to Carmine Falcone and was shown to have notorious enforcer Tony Zucco as one of his henchmen. Both Sal Maroni and Carmine Falcone believe that the serial killer Holiday (so named for assassinating mobsters on holidays) is working for the other, which strains their previously ironclad business relationship. When his father is killed by Holiday, Maroni makes a deal with Dent to reveal all of Falcone's criminal activities in exchange for leniency.

However, Falcone's daughter Sofia — Maroni's secret lover — visits him in jail, where she falsely claims Dent, not Falcone, is responsible for the killings and his father's death. Dent's corrupt assistant Vernon Fields provides Maroni prior to his court appearance with "stomach medicine" for a supposed ulcer. During the trial, Maroni throws the disguised acid into Dent's face, disfiguring him. Maroni then gets into a scuffle with a bailiff who shoots him twice in the chest, which he survives.

When he is moved out of his cell, Maroni is finally killed by Holiday. The killer is revealed to be Alberto Falcone, who committed the murders to make a name for himself independent of his family. Maroni's sons Pino and Umberto later offer their services to Sofia Falcone and are later killed in the Columbus Day Massacre orchestrated by Two-Face.

The New 52
In 2011, The New 52 rebooted the DC universe. Maroni was later in court for multiple accusations of rape. Sal Maroni met with Mr. Haly at Haly's Circus. When it was mentioned that his son CJ helped Dick Grayson return to Haly's Circus, Maroni stated that he would be indebted to the circus should they ever need help.

Other versions

Elseworlds
Sal Maroni appears in the Elseworlds story "Citizen Wayne" which was published in 1994. Set in the 1930s, the story depicts Maroni as an Al Capone-like crime lord who is heavily involved in bootlegging, and who lures the cops trying to investigate him into a trap when they are led to believe that they can get him for tax evasion (Capone was eventually jailed for tax fraud). In this version, Maroni scars Harvey Dent's entire face with acid in an attempt to kill him. This leads Dent to assume the Batman mantle and break up Maroni's operations before finally killing him in revenge. Bruce Wayne is a newspaper publisher and fierce critic of Batman who, following Maroni's death, decides to take down the Caped Crusader personally; he feels that Batman has overstepped the mark by committing murder. The pair are killed during the fight and, much like Citizen Kane, their story is told in flashbacks as a young Assistant District Attorney interviews their friends and acquaintances, including Maroni's surviving henchmen.

Batman '66 
In Batman '66, Sal "Lucky" Maroni snapped during a trial conducted by Harvey Dent and threw acid in Dent's face, causing the DA's transformation into Two-Face.

In other media

Television

 Salvatore Maroni appears in the Fox series Gotham, portrayed by David Zayas. During the first season, he is a mob boss who is in conflict with Carmine Falcone. He also employs Oswald Cobblepot, unaware of him being an informant for Falcone. In the season one finale "All Happy Families Are Alike", he is killed by Fish Mooney.
 The Maroni family appears in Titans episode "Jason Todd". They are responsible for the death of Tony Zucco's family, which led to Tony's son Nick blaming Dick Grayson for their deaths.

Film

 In Batman Forever, the character is referred to as "Boss Moroni" (portrayed by Dennis Paladino) and appears in a brief television news segment explaining the origin of Two-Face. Maroni throws acid in district attorney Harvey Dent's face despite Batman's intervention, as in the comics.
 Sal Maroni appears in two segments of Batman: Gotham Knight, voiced by Rob Paulsen. In the stories "Crossfire" and "Field Test", he's at war with Gotham's Russian mob.
 Eric Roberts portrays Sal Maroni in The Dark Knight. In the film, Maroni has taken over as the boss of Carmine Falcone's crime family following his fall from power. He is presumably killed by Harvey Dent in a car accident as revenge against the mob.
 Sal Maroni appears in Batman: The Killing Joke, voiced by Rick D. Wasserman.
 Sal Maroni appears in Batman: The Long Halloween, voiced by Jim Pirri.

The Batman franchise 
 Sal Maroni is briefly seen on a television screen in The Batman, portrayed by an uncredited extra. Maroni is mentioned as having been arrested in the largest drug bust in GCPD history, although events in the film reveal that he was set up by Carmine Falcone and corrupt city officials.
 Salvatore Maroni will appear in The Penguin on HBO Max, and will be played by Clancy Brown.

References

External links
 Sal Maroni at DC Wiki
 Sal Maroni at Comic Vine
 Sal Maroni at Gotham Wiki

Comics characters introduced in 1942
Fictional gangsters
DC Comics film characters
DC Comics television characters
Characters created by Bob Kane
Characters created by Bill Finger
Fictional crime bosses
Fictional Italian American people
Male film villains
Male characters in television
Action film villains